The Scheibe SF-23 Sperling (en:Sparrow) is a 1950s German two-seat cabin monoplane.

Development
 
The Sperling was the first design of powered aircraft to come from the Scheibe Flugzeugbau company which had started building gliders in 1951. The prototype first flew on 8 August 1955 and the initial production SF-23A aircraft first flew in September 1958.

The Sperling is a high-wing braced monoplane with side-by-side seating for two in an enclosed cabin. It had a fixed tailwheel landing gear and was initially powered by a  Continental C90 piston engine. The Sperling utilizes mixed construction, the fuselage being a fabric-covered steel-tube structure and the wings being single-spar wooden structures with fabric and plywood covering. Production of the Sperling was completed in 1963.

Operation
Most aircraft produced were sold to German private pilots and flying clubs but one was purchased by a British owner. The higher powered versions were suitable for use in glider-towing. By 2009, seven examples remained in active operation in Germany.

Variants

SF-23A
Production variant with a  Continental C90-12F engine, 17 built.
SF-23B
Production variant with a  Continental O-200-B engine, four built.
SF-23C
Production variant with a  Lycoming O-235 engine, six built.

Specifications (SF-23A)

References

Notes

Bibliography

 

1950s German civil utility aircraft
Sperling
Motor gliders
Single-engined tractor aircraft
High-wing aircraft
Aircraft first flown in 1955